I Didn't Do It is a 1945 British comedy crime film directed by Marcel Varnel and starring George Formby, Dennis Wyndham and Carl Jaffe. Formby's songs include: "She's Got Two Of Everything"' (Cunningham/Towers), "'I'd Like A Dream Like That'" (Formby/Cliffe), and "The Daring Young Man"' (Formby/Cliffe). Because of a realistic murder scene, the film was granted a British 'A' certificate, ensuring no one under the age of 16 would be admitted to the cinema unless accompanied by an adult.

Plot 
A man named George Trotter staying at a theatrical boarding house is framed for a murder.

Cast 
 George Formby as George Trotter
 Billy Caryll as Tiger Tubbs
 Hilda Mundy as Ma Tubbs
 Gaston Palmer as Le Grand Gaston
 Jack Daly as Terry O'Rourke
 Carl Jaffe as Hilary Vance
 Marjorie Browne as Betty Dickinson
 Wally Patch as Sergeant Carp
 Ian Fleming as Chief Inspector Twyning
 Vincent Holman as Erasmus Montague
 Dennis Wyndham as Tom Driscoll
 Jack Raine as J.B Cato
 Georgina Cookson as Willow Thane
 Merle Tottenham as Tessie
 Gordon McLeod as Superintendent Belstock
 Honor Boswell as Alpha
 Beryl Boswell as Omega

Critical reception
Halliwell's Film Guide comments that it is "one of the star's last vehicles, not too bad at all, but without the sweet smell of success"; while TV Guide gave the film two out of four stars, and noted, "Five screenwriters collaborated on the script, churning out a lively, witty programmer".

References

External links 
 

1945 films
British crime comedy films
1940s English-language films
Films directed by Marcel Varnel
1940s crime comedy films
British black-and-white films
Films produced by Marcel Varnel
1945 comedy films
1940s British films